Nicolas Bolduc (born 5 March 1973) is a Canadian cinematographer from Montreal, Quebec. He won the Canadian Screen Award for Best Cinematography two years in a row, in the 1st Canadian Screen Awards and 2nd Canadian Screen Awards, for War Witch (2012) and Enemy (2013). He also won the Jutra Award for War Witch, and was nominated the next year for Louis Cyr. Bolduc was nominated for Best Cinematography at the Prix Iris in 2017 for Two Lovers and a Bear.

With Hochelaga, Land of Souls (2017), he competed at Camerimage, and won Best Cinematography at the 6th Canadian Screen Awards. He also won Best Cinematography at the 20th Quebec Cinema Awards for Hochelaga, Land of Souls.

He was one of four directors, alongside Fabrice Barrilliet, Julien Knafo and Marie-Hélène Panisset, of the 2009 collective film Blind Spot.

Filmography

References

External links
 

1973 births
Best Cinematography Genie and Canadian Screen Award winners
Canadian cinematographers
Film directors from Montreal
Living people
Artists from Montreal
Best Cinematography Jutra and Iris Award winners